Tolland is the name of some places:
in Australia
 Tolland, New South Wales
in the UK
 Tolland, Somerset
in the USA
Tolland, Colorado
Tolland, Connecticut 
Tolland, Massachusetts 
Tolland County, Connecticut